The Gate of All Nations (Old Persian: duvarthim visadahyum) also known as the Gate of Xerxes, is located in the ruins of the ancient city of Persepolis, Iran.

The construction of the Stairs of All Nations and the Gate of All Nations was ordered by the Achaemenid king Xerxes I (486–465 BC), the successor of the founder of Persepolis, Darius I the Great.

Building

The structure consisted of one large room whose roof was supported by four stone columns with bell-shaped bases. Parallel to the inner walls of this room ran a stone bench, interrupted at the doorways. The outside walls, made of broad mud block, were bedecked with frequent niches. Each of the three walls, on the east, west, and south, had a very large stone doorway. A pair of massive bulls secured the western entrance; two Lamassu in the Assyrian style, albeit, of colossal proportions, stood at the eastern doorway. Engraved above each of the four colossi is a trilingual inscription attesting to Xerxes having built and fulfilled the gate. The doorway on the south, opening toward the Apadana, is the widest of the three. Pivoting devices found on the inner corners of all the doors indicate that they must have had two-leaved doors, which were possibly made of wood and covered with sheets of ornamented metal.

Gallery

References

External links
 
 Gate of Xerxes
 The Gate of All Nations at Wikimapia
 The Grand Stairway and the Gate of All Nations
 Shiraz Persepolis
 Persepolis: Gate of All Nations 

Persepolis
Xerxes I